Division No. 16 is one of eighteen census divisions in the province of Saskatchewan, Canada, as defined by Statistics Canada. It is located in the north-central part of the province. The most populous community in this division is North Battleford.

Demographics 

Census subdivisions 
The following census subdivisions (municipalities or municipal equivalents) are located within Saskatchewan's Division No. 16.

Cities
North Battleford

Towns
Big River
Blaine Lake
Hafford
Radisson
Shellbrook
Spiritwood

Villages

Borden
Canwood
Debden
Denholm
Krydor
Leask
Leoville
Marcelin
Maymont
Medstead
Parkside
Richard
Ruddell
Shell Lake
Speers

Resort villages
Big Shell
Echo Bay
Pebble Baye

Rural municipalities

 RM No. 405 Great Bend
 RM No. 406 Mayfield
 RM No. 434 Blaine Lake
 RM No. 435 Redberry
 RM No. 436 Douglas
 RM No. 437 North Battleford
 RM No. 464 Leask
 RM No. 466 Meeting Lake
 RM No. 467 Round Hill
 RM No. 493 Shellbrook
 RM No. 494 Canwood
 RM No. 496 Spiritwood
 RM No. 497 Medstead
 RM No. 555 Big River

Crown colonies
 North Battleford Crown Colony

Unorganized areas
 Prince Albert National Park

Indian reserves

 Indian Reserve --Ahtahkakoop 104
 Indian Reserve --Big River 118
 Indian Reserve --Chitek Lake 191
 Indian Reserve --Little Red River 106D
 Indian Reserve --Lucky Man
 Indian Reserve --Mistawasis 103
 Indian Reserve --Muskeg Lake 102B
 Indian Reserve --Muskeg Lake 102D
 Indian Reserve --Muskeg Lake 102E
 Indian Reserve --Muskeg Lake 102F
 Indian Reserve --Muskeg Lake 102G
 Indian Reserve --Muskeg Lake Cree Nation 102
 Indian Reserve --Pelican Lake 191A
 Indian Reserve --Pelican Lake 191B
 Indian Reserve --Saulteaux 159A
 Indian Reserve --Sturgeon Lake 101
 Indian Reserve --Sweet Grass 113-L6
 Indian Reserve --Witchekan Lake 117
 Indian Reserve --Witchekan Lake 117D

See also 
List of census divisions of Saskatchewan
List of communities in Saskatchewan

References

Division No. 16, Saskatchewan Statistics Canada

 
16